Baixa Grande do Ribeiro is a municipality in the state of Piauí in the Northeast region of Brazil.

The municipality contains part of the Uruçui-Una Ecological Station.

See also
List of municipalities in Piauí

References

Municipalities in Piauí